Moonstone is a sodium potassium aluminium silicate ((Na,K)AlSi3O8) of the feldspar group that displays a pearly and opalescent schiller. An alternative name for moonstone is hecatolite.

Etymology

The name moonstone derives from the stone's characteristic visual effect, called adularescence (or schiller), which produces a milky, bluish interior light. This effect is caused by light diffraction through alternating layers of orthoclast and albite within the stone. The diffracted light varies from white to blue, depending on the thinness of the albite layers. More technically, this micro-structure consists of regular exsolution layers (lamellae) of different alkali feldspars (orthoclase and sodium-rich plagioclase).

Polished moonstones often display chatoyancy ("cat's eye" effect), where a luminous streak appears through the stone. Asterism is rare and produces four-legged stars.

Geology
The most common moonstone is of the orthoclase feldspar mineral adularia, named for an early mining site near Mt. Adular in Switzerland, now the town of St. Gotthard. A solid solution of the plagioclase feldspar oligoclase +/− the potassium feldspar orthoclase also produces moonstone specimens.

Deposits of moonstone occur in Armenia (mainly from Lake Sevan), Australia, the Austrian Alps, Mexico, Madagascar, Myanmar, Norway, Poland, India, Sri Lanka, 
and the United States. Historically, the most valuable, transparent moonstones with strong blue sheen came from Myanmar. Today, most commercial moonstones come from Sri Lanka.

In culture
Moonstone has been used in jewellery for millennia, including ancient civilizations. The Romans admired moonstone, as they believed it was derived from solidified rays of the Moon. Both the Romans and Greeks associated moonstone with their lunar deities. In more recent history, moonstone became popular during the Art Nouveau period; French goldsmith René Lalique and many others created a large quantity of jewellery using this stone.

The moonstone is the Florida State Gemstone; it was designated as such in 1970 to commemorate the Moon landings, which took off from Kennedy Space Center. However, it does not naturally occur in the state.

References

External links

Feldspar
Gemstones
Symbols of Florida